Hugo Francis Bezdek (April 1, 1884 – September 19, 1952) was a Czech American athlete who played American football and was a coach of football, basketball, and baseball.  He was the head football coach at the University of Oregon (1906, 1913–1917), the University of Arkansas (1908–1912), Pennsylvania State University (1918–1929), and Delaware Valley College (1949).  Bezdek also coached the Mare Island Marines in the 1918 Rose Bowl and the Cleveland Rams of the National Football League (NFL) in 1937 and part of the 1938 season.  In addition, Bezdek coached basketball at Oregon (1906–1907, 1913–1917) and Penn State (1919), coached baseball at Arkansas (1909–1913), Oregon (1914–1917) and Penn State (1920–1930), and served as the manager of Major League Baseball's Pittsburgh Pirates (1917–1919).  He was inducted into the College Football Hall of Fame as a coach in 1954.

Coach Bezdek is the only Coach to bring three different teams to the Rose Bowl Game; University of Oregon, Mare Island Marines and Pennsylvania State University. Bezdek was inducted into the Rose Bowl Hall of Fame on December 31, 2022.

Early years
Bezdek was born near Prague, Bohemia (now part of the present-day Czech Republic). His fore fathers had been school-teachers, strong men and athletes. His family emigrated to America in 1891 when he was 6 years old. They lived in Cleveland's Slavic Community. His father James (Valcav), worked at as a butcher in Cleveland. His father, hence Hugo, can be found in the Cleveland City directory at 51 (5787) Portage Ave in 1895. and 156(5500) Fleet Ave. from 1896-98 St. The Fleet Ave. address still stands today. Around 1900 the family, James, Frances and Hugo moved to 4846 South Paulina St., Chicago Ill. where his father continued working as a butcher and 16 year old Hugo is "at school." It appears this structure is also standing. From here, young Hugo launched his Athletic Career. He enjoyed playing sports typical of the day. While he favored football, he also boxed, wrestled and played baseball.

Coaching career

After playing as a fullback at the University of Chicago, Bezdek began his football coaching career at the University of Oregon in 1906, but left after a year to become head coach at the University of Arkansas. Arkansas' athletic teams were known as the Cardinals until after the 1909 season. Near the end of that year, Coach Bezdek called his team "a wild band of Razorback hogs" at an impromptu press conference following his team's victory over LSU. The name was a hit with the Arkansas students, and they voted to change the school's mascot from Cardinals to Razorbacks the following school term. Razorbacks has been Arkansas' mascot since that time. The 1909 team finished 7-0 and were considered the "Champions of the South". After five years at Arkansas, he returned to Oregon for six seasons.

While coaching in Oregon,  Bezdek also served as a scout for Major League Baseball's Pittsburgh Pirates, who hired him as their manager in the middle of the 1917 season.  He managed the Pirates through 1919, compiling a 166–187 record.

While managing the Pirates, Bezdek continued his football coaching career, moving from Oregon to Penn State in 1919.  He was head coach there until 1929, amassing a 65–30–11 record that included two undefeated seasons and an appearance in the 1923 Rose Bowl.  Bezdek was noted for changing the Nittany Lions' style of play.

Bezdek also served as Penn State's athletic director from 1918 to 1936, was interim basketball coach in 1919, garnering an 11–2 record, and director of the School of Physical Education and Athletics from 1930 to 1937.

In 1937, Bezdek was hired by the Cleveland Rams as their first head coach after the team joined the National Football League (NFL).  His career with the Rams was brief, ending three games into the 1938 season with an abysmal 1–13 record.  Nevertheless, Bezdek  holds the distinction of being the only person to have served as both manager of a Major League Baseball team and head coach in the NFL. 

As a college football coach, Bezdek tallied a career record of 127–58–16.  He was elected to the College Football Hall of Fame in 1954.

Head coaching record

College football

Professional football

See also
 List of College Football Hall of Fame inductees (coaches)
 List of presidents of the American Football Coaches Association

References

External links

 
 

1884 births
1952 deaths
American people of Bohemian descent
American football fullbacks
American men's basketball coaches
Chicago Maroons football coaches
Chicago Maroons football players
Cleveland Rams coaches
Arkansas Razorbacks baseball coaches
Arkansas Razorbacks football coaches
Delaware Valley Aggies football coaches
Mare Island Marines football coaches
Oregon Ducks men's basketball coaches
Oregon Ducks football coaches
Penn State Nittany Lions athletic directors
Penn State Nittany Lions baseball coaches
Penn State Nittany Lions football coaches
Penn State Nittany Lions basketball coaches
Pittsburgh Pirates managers
College Football Hall of Fame inductees
Austro-Hungarian emigrants to the United States
People from the Kingdom of Bohemia
Czech players of American football
Sportspeople from Prague
Cleveland Rams head coaches